Vosler is a surname. Notable people with the surname include:

Forrest L. Vosler (1923–1992), American aviator
Jason Vosler (born 1993), American baseball player
Kent Vosler (born 1955), American diver

See also
Vogler (surname)
Vossler